Broken Arrow or Broken Arrows may refer to:

Places
"Broken Arrow" (Korea), nickname for Haktang-ni, Republic of Korea, site of a battle during the Korean War
Broken Arrow, Oklahoma, United States
Broken Arrow Ranch, summer camp in Kansas
Broken Arrow Ranch, former home of singer Neil Young

Arts, entertainment, and media

Films
Broken Arrow (1950 film), a Golden Globe-winning western film starring James Stewart
Broken Arrow (1996 film), an action film starring John Travolta, Christian Slater and directed by John Woo

Music
Broken Arrow, a Canadian band featuring Paul Humphrey
Broken Arrow (band), a band from Los Angeles, California
Broken Arrow (album), a 1996 album by Neil Young and Crazy Horse
Broken Arrow 1995 album by Charlie Mars Band, Dualtone Music

Songs
"Broken Arrow" (Buffalo Springfield song), 1967
"Broken Arrow" (Pixie Lott song), 2010
"Broken Arrow" (Robbie Robertson song), 1987, covered by Rod Stewart and Ruin/Renewal
"Broken Arrow", a 1959 single by Chuck Berry from the album Rockin' at the Hops
"Broken Arrows" (song), a 2015 song by Avicii
"Broken Arrows", a song by Daughtry from their 2013 album Baptized
"Aka... Broken Arrow", by Noel Gallagher's High Flying Birds from their eponymous album

Other arts, entertainment, and media 
Broken Arrow (TV series), an ABC television series, 1956–1960
 "Broken Arrow" (Arrow), an episode of Arrow

Other uses
 Broken Arrow (nuclear), an accidental nuclear event involving nuclear weapons, warheads, or components which does not create the risk of nuclear war
 "Broken Arrow", a code phrase notably used during the 1965 Battle of Ia Drang to indicate an American combat unit was in danger of being overrun